Santo Antônio da Alegria is a municipality in the northern part of the state of São Paulo in Brazil. The population is 6,977 (2020 est.) in an area of 310.29 km². The elevation is 791 m. A neighboring municipality is São Sebastião do Paraíso in Minas Gerais to the northeast.

Government 

 Mayor: Ricardo da Silva Sobrinho (2021/2024)
 Vice Mayor: Denilson de Carvalho (2021/2024)

References

External links
  http://www.santoantoniodaalegria.sp.gov.br
  citybrazil.com.br

Municipalities in São Paulo (state)